In mathematics, Cahen's constant is defined as the value of an infinite series of unit fractions with alternating signs: 

Here  denotes Sylvester's sequence, which is defined recursively by

Combining these fractions in pairs leads to an alternative expansion of Cahen's constant as a series of positive unit fractions formed from the terms in even positions of Sylvester's sequence. This series for Cahen's constant forms its greedy Egyptian expansion:

This constant is named after Eugène Cahen (also known for the Cahen–Mellin integral), who was the first to introduce it and prove its irrationality.

Continued fraction expansion 
The majority of naturally occurring mathematical constants have no known simple patterns in their continued fraction expansions. Nevertheless, the complete continued fraction expansion of Cahen's constant  is known: it is

where the sequence of coefficients

is defined by the recurrence relation

All the partial quotients of this expansion are squares of integers. Davison and Shallit made use of the continued fraction expansion to prove that  is transcendental.

Alternatively, one may express the partial quotients in the continued fraction expansion of Cahen's constant through the terms of Sylvester's sequence: To see this, we prove by induction on  that .

As a consequence,  holds for every , from which it is easy to conclude that 

.

Best approximation order 
Cahen's constant  has best approximation order . That means, there exist constants  such that the inequality 
 has infinitely many solutions , while the inequality  has at most finitely many solutions .

To give a proof, denote by  the sequence of convergents to Cahen's constant (that means).

But now it follows from and the recursion for  that  

 

for every . As a consequence, the limits  

 and  

Numerically, one can check that . Thus the well-known inequality  

 

yields  

 and  

for all sufficiently large . Therefore  has best approximation order 3 (with ), where we use that any solution  to 

 

is necessarily a convergent to Cahen's constant.

Notes

References

External links 

Mathematical constants
Real transcendental numbers